Sleepy Creek Lake is a  impoundment of the Meadow Branch of Sleepy Creek in Berkeley County in West Virginia's Eastern Panhandle. The reservoir is located entirely within the Sleepy Creek Wildlife Management Area.

History
Sleepy Creek Lake was constructed by the West Virginia Division of Natural Resources (WVDNR) and was completed in 1962. The lake was opened for fishing in 1964. WVDNR began stocking the reservoir with northern pike in 1989.

Description
Sleepy Creek Lake is a reservoir located at an elevation of  within the  Sleepy Creek Wildlife Management Area, which lies within both Morgan and Berkeley counties. The lake is nestled between two mountain ridges: Sleepy Creek Mountain and Third Hill Mountain.

Sleepy Creek Lake provides fishing for largemouth bass, bluegill, crappie, northern pike, and channel catfish.

References

Rivers of Berkeley County, West Virginia
Reservoirs in West Virginia
Potomac River watershed
1962 establishments in West Virginia
1962 in the environment